Bongolo may refer to:

Gabon
Bongolo, Gabon
Bongolo Hospital
Bongolo Caves

Republic of Congo
Bongolo, Republic of Congo

Other
 Bongolo (film)

See also
Bongolo Dam (disambiguation)